Li Yuyang (born 24 September 1997) is a Chinese footballer who plays for Chinese Super League side Guangzhou R&F.

Club career
Li Yuyang was promoted to Chinese Super League side Guangzhou R&F first team squad by manager Dragan Stojković in 2016. In August 2016, he was loaned to Hong Kong Premier League side R&F, which was the satellite team of Guangzhou R&F. He made his senior debut on 23 October 2016 in a 2–0 home defeat against Wofoo Tai Po, coming on as a substitute for Min Junlin in the 46th minute. Li returned to Guangzhou R&F in January 2017. On 10 March 2018, he made his debut for the club in a 2–0 home win over Dalian Yifang, coming on as a substitute for Xiao Zhi in the 89th minute.

Career statistics
Statistics accurate as of match played 31 December 2020.

References

External links
 

1997 births
Living people
Association football forwards
Chinese footballers
Footballers from Guangzhou
Guangzhou City F.C. players
R&F (Hong Kong) players
Chinese Super League players
Hong Kong Premier League players
21st-century Chinese people